The Cardinal is a long distance passenger train operated by Amtrak between New York Penn Station and Chicago Union Station via Philadelphia, Washington, D.C., Charlottesville, Charleston, Huntington, Cincinnati, and Indianapolis. Along with the Capitol Limited and Lake Shore Limited, it is one of three trains linking the Northeast and Chicago. Its  trip between New York and Chicago takes 28 hours. 

The Cardinal has three round trips each week, departing New York City on Sundays, Wednesdays, and Fridays, and departing Chicago on Tuesdays, Thursdays, and Saturdays. Prior to being discontinued in 2019, the Hoosier State provided service on the portion of the Cardinal's route between Indianapolis and Chicago on the other four days of the week.

The Cardinal's ridership was about 69,000 in FY2021, which is 37% off its pre-Covid pandemic ridership of about 109,000 in FY2019. In the two fiscal years prior to the pandemic (FY2018 and FY2019), ridership had increased 12.5%. In FY2020, the Cardinal earned $7.1 million on expenses of $22.6M—a revenue-to-cost ratio of 31%, the second lowest among all Amtrak routes.

History 

The Cardinal is the successor of several previous trains, primarily the New York Central (later Penn Central) James Whitcomb Riley and the Chesapeake and Ohio Railway (C&O) George Washington. The James Whitcomb Riley was a daytime all-coach train which operated between Chicago and Cincinnati (via Indianapolis). The George Washington, the C&O's flagship train, was a long-distance sleeper that ran between Cincinnati and–via a split in Charlottesville, Virginia–Washington, D.C. and Newport News, Virginia. Until the late 1950s, the Riley carried the Washingtons sleeper cars between Cincinnati and Chicago. Both routes survived until the formation of Amtrak in 1971.

Amtrak kept service mostly identical through the spring and summer of 1971. It slowly began integrating the trains that summer. The two trains began exchanging through Washington–Chicago and Newport News–Chicago coaches at Cincinnati on July 12, and a through sleeping car began September 8. On November 14, the Riley and George Washington merged into a single long-distance Chicago-Washington train, with the eastbound train (train 50) known as the George Washington and the westbound train (train 51) known as the Riley. The eastern terminus was briefly extended to Boston, giving the Northeast Corridor a one-seat ride to Chicago. However, it was truncated back to Washington in 1972. On May 19, 1974, Amtrak fully merged the George Washington into the Riley.

During the early Amtrak era, the Riley was plagued by the poor condition of ex-New York Central track in Indiana. In 1973, it was moved to ex-Pennsylvania Railroad track through Indianapolis. The Newport News section ended in 1976, replaced by the Boston–Newport News Colonial. A number of long-distance trains running along former Penn Central trackage in the Midwest were plagued by similar problems.

The James Whitcomb Riley was renamed the Cardinal on October 30, 1977, as the cardinal was the state bird of all six states through which it ran. However, due to poor track conditions in Indiana, the train was rerouted numerous times, first over various Penn Central/Conrail routings that had once been part of the Pennsylvania Railroad, then ultimately over the former Baltimore and Ohio route via Cottage Grove by 1980.

The Cardinal was eventually extended to run along the Northeast Corridor again in an effort to improve the Cardinal's cost recovery ratio, but this time with the eastern terminus moved to New York. Previously, the Broadway Limited ran from New York to Chicago along the Northeast Corridor, but only as far south as Philadelphia. The train was discontinued on September 30, 1981, but revived on January 8, 1982, per a mandate initiated by Senator Robert C. Byrd. While the Cardinal and its predecessors had run daily, the revived Cardinal ran only three times per week. The revived train followed another new route, via Richmond and Muncie, Indiana. This arrangement lasted until April 27, 1986, when the train was finally moved to its current route via Indianapolis. On October 29, 1995, the Cardinal was truncated to Washington, D.C. after the consist was updated with Superliners. On October 27, 2002, after derailments on other routes depleted available Superliner cars, the Superliners were replaced with Viewliners. The Cardinal continued to operate the Chicago-Washington D.C. schedule. Service to New York was restored on Sunday's westbound Cardinal on October 27, 2003. Full service to New York resumed on April 26, 2004.

From March 29, 2018, to November 8, 2018, due to continuing construction at New York Penn Station, the Cardinals eastern terminus was temporarily moved to Washington. Cardinal passengers needing to travel to or from points north of Washington were transferred to a Northeast Regional.

Hoosier State 

With the Indianapolis routing, the Cardinal began operating jointly with the Chicago–Indianapolis Hoosier State. The Hoosier State operated to Indianapolis on the days the Cardinal did not, assuring seven-day service between Chicago and Indianapolis. This pattern ceased on October 25, 1987, when the Hoosier State became a full-fledged daily train once again. The Hoosier State was dropped on September 8, 1995, but resumed again on July 19, 1998, again running on days that the Cardinal did not run.

On December 17, 1999, Amtrak extended the Hoosier State to Jeffersonville, Indiana, (and later to Louisville, Kentucky) and renamed the train the Kentucky Cardinal. This new train was a daily service; on days when the Cardinal operated, the two trains ran combined between Indianapolis and Chicago. Amtrak ultimately discontinued the Kentucky Cardinal on July 4, 2003, and brought back the Hoosier State on the pre-1999 schedule.

After Indiana discontinued its subsidy, Amtrak suspended the Hoosier State as of June 30, 2019. Passengers who booked trips after that date were compensated with Cardinal tickets.

Plans 
In the July 2010 issue of Trains magazine, the Cardinal was noted as being one of five routes under consideration for performance improvement. For the Cardinal, the proposed changes included increasing service from thrice-weekly to daily operation, and changing the western terminus to St. Louis, Missouri. Railfan and Railroad magazine also suggested that the train be rerouted to St. Louis, with a separate section bound for Chicago.

In early October 2010, Amtrak released a report detailing plans to increase the Cardinals service from thrice-weekly to daily service, as well as increasing the train's on-time performance and food service. The January 2011 issue of Trains later revealed that Amtrak would scrap re-routing and Superliner conversion and instead adopt not only daily service, but also purchasing dome cars to be used along the Chicago-Washington, D.C., portion of the trip. In addition, the routing into Chicago Union Station would be changed and station platforms along the route containing coal dust would be scrubbed and cleaned.

However, obstacles to a daily Cardinal persist. Track capacity is limited on the Buckingham Branch Railroad, a short line railroad between Orange and Clifton Forge, Virginia where the Cardinal operates along former C&O/CSX trackage, preventing frequent freight trains from passing a daily Cardinal. This problem also applied to the planned-but-failed Greenbrier Presidential Express train, which would also have traversed the Buckingham Branch on a weekly basis. The Buckingham Branch requires additional funding to expand several sidings before allowing additional service. Another obstacle is freight congestion in Chicago particularly at the 75th Street Corridor on Chicago's South Side. The third obstacle is capacity at the Long Bridge in Washington, D.C.. Infrastructure improvements are being made at all three. The Orange Branch between Orange and Gordonsville raised train speed after the completion of a track and signal project in 2017. The Chicago Region Environmental and Transportation Efficiency Program (CREATE) has received funding under a public–private partnership (P3) for the 75th Street Corridor with construction beginning in October 2018 and is scheduled to be finished by 2025. A parallel span of the Long Bridge is full funded and moving towards engineering design and financing.

Starting on October 1, 2019, traditional dining car services were removed and replaced with a reduced menu of 'Flexible Dining' options. As a result, the changes to the consist of the train will have the dining car serve as a lounge car for the exclusive use of sleeping car passengers.

In June 2021, Senator Jon Tester of Montana added an amendment to the Surface Transportation Investment Act of 2021 which would require the Department of Transportation (not Amtrak itself) to evaluate daily service on all less frequent long-distance trains, meaning the Cardinal and Sunset Limited. The bill passed the Senate Commerce Committee with bipartisan support, and was later rolled into President Biden's Infrastructure Investment and Jobs Act, which Congress passed on November 5, 2021. The report must be delivered to Congress within two years.

Train consist 
In the early 1990s, the Cardinal ran with the usual Amtrak long-distance consist of two F40s/E60 plus several material handling cars (MHC) and baggage cars, followed by several Amfleet coaches, an Amfleet lounge, a Heritage diner, two or three Heritage 10-6 sleepers, a slumbercoach, and finally, a baggage dormitory car. Following the delivery of the Superliner II fleet, however, the Cardinal was re-equipped with Superliner cars in 1995. As a result, its route was truncated to end in Washington D.C.; then, as now, Superliners could not operate north of Washington due to low clearances in Baltimore and New York City. With the Superliner equipment, the consist would usually be two Superliner sleeping cars, a diner, a Sightseer Lounge, a baggage coach, and a coach.

In 2002, two derailments on other routes took numerous Superliner cars out of service. Because of this, insufficient Superliner equipment was available for use on the Cardinal. The Cardinal was re-equipped with a consist of single-level long-distance cars, including dining, lounge, sleeping, and dormitory cars, although service to New York was not restored until 2004. Subsequent fleet shortages shortened the Cardinal further, and at one point, the train was running with two or three Amfleet II coaches and a combined diner-lounge car. While the sleeping car was later restored, the Cardinal has not had a dormitory car or a diner since. Similarly, though the baggage car was also removed, it was restored in response to an upturn in patronage in mid-2010. In 2016, Amtrak added business class service to the Cardinal.

The Cardinal's current typical consist includes a single locomotive, three Amfleet II long-distance coaches, a single Amfleet II Diner-Lite diner-lounge car, one or two Viewliner II sleeping cars, and a Viewliner II baggage-dorm car.

Route overview 
Amtrak bills the Cardinals route as one of the most scenic in its system. After an early morning departure from New York and traveling south down the Northeast Corridor, the train passes through Virginia's rolling horse country, across the Blue Ridge and the Shenandoah Valley. It then climbs the Allegheny Mountains and stops at the resort town of White Sulphur Springs, home to The Greenbrier, a famous luxury resort. The Cardinal descends on tracks through New River Gorge National Park and Preserve, a unit of the National Park Service protecting the longest deepest river gorge in the Eastern U.S. The river is popular for white water rafting, and the cliffs attract rock climbers. The forests blaze with autumn foliage and the train usually sells out during the peak season. The Cardinal will often add the only remaining full-length dome car in Amtrak service, car number 10031, to the consist in the autumn to try to accommodate the leaf peepers.

The schedules are timed to provide a daylight transit of the New River Gorge almost all year. So westbound, the train travels at night from Charleston, West Virginia, on to Indianapolis, where it arrives about dawn, reaching Chicago in mid-morning. Eastbound the Cardinal departs late afternoon, reaching Indianapolis before midnight, Charleston mid-morning, and NYC in the late evening. Unfortunately, Cincinnati is served both directions with stops after midnight, yet about 15,000 passengers a year arrive or depart from this station.

The Cardinal is one of only two of Amtrak's 15 long-distance trains to operate only three days a week, the other being the Sunset Limited. Like other long-distance trains, passengers are not allowed to travel only between stations on the Northeast Corridor on the Cardinal. Eastbound trains only stop to discharge passengers from Alexandria northward, and westbound trains only stop to receive passengers from Newark to Washington. This policy aims to keep seats available for passengers making longer trips; passengers traveling between Northeast Corridor stations can use the more frequent Acela Express or Northeast Regional services.

Route details 
 
The Cardinal operates over Amtrak, CSX Transportation, Norfolk Southern Railway, Buckingham Branch Railroad, Canadian National Railway, Union Pacific Railroad, and Metra trackage:

Amtrak Northeast Corridor, New York to Washington
CSX RF&P Subdivision, Washington to Alexandria
NS Washington District, Alexandria to Orange
BB Orange Subdivision and North Mountain Subdivision, Orange to Clifton Forge
CSX Alleghany Subdivision, New River Subdivision, Kanawha Subdivision, Russell Subdivision, Northern Subdivision, Cincinnati Subdivision, Cincinnati Terminal Subdivision, Indianapolis Subdivision, Indianapolis Terminal Subdivision, Crawfordsville Branch Subdivision, Lafayette Subdivision, and Monon Subdivision, Clifton Forge to Munster
CN Elsdon Subdivision, Munster to Thornton
UP Villa Grove Subdivision, Thornton to 81st Street
BRC Kenton Line Subdivision, 81st Street to 74th Street
Metra SouthWest Service, 74th Street to Chicago
NS Chicago Line, CP 518 to Chicago (Depending on Dispatcher preference, The Cardinal often runs between CP 518 and 21st Street on NS)

The Buckingham Branch trackage is one of the few Class III railroad used in the Amtrak system.

Station stops

Ridership

References

Notes

Further reading 
 Mike Schafer, Amtrak's atlas, Trains, June 1991
 
 
 Amtrak October 2010 report on the Cardinal

External links 

Amtrak routes
Passenger rail transportation in New York (state)
Passenger rail transportation in New Jersey
Passenger rail transportation in Pennsylvania
Passenger rail transportation in Delaware
Passenger rail transportation in Maryland
Passenger rail transportation in Washington, D.C.
Passenger rail transportation in Virginia
Passenger rail transportation in West Virginia
Passenger rail transportation in Kentucky
Passenger rail transportation in Ohio
Passenger rail transportation in Indiana
Passenger rail transportation in Illinois
Night trains of the United States
Railway services introduced in 1977
Passenger rail transportation in Cincinnati
Long distance Amtrak routes